Museum of Slavonia is the largest general-type museum in Croatia.

Museum of Slavonia was established in 1877 in Osijek. Since 1946, it is located in the City Magistracy building, constructed in 1702 for the purposes of the Vienna Chamber, town government and police. Today, among the museums numerous collections, the most prized are the Roman Mursa and numismatic collections. The Museum's library contains more than 70,000 books.

Notes

External links
Official website 

Museums established in 1877
1877 establishments in Croatia
Art museums and galleries in Osijek
Museums in Osijek
History of Osijek